The 2019 Constellation Cup was the 10th Constellation Cup series between Australia and New Zealand. The series featured four netball test matches, played in October 2019. The series finished 2–2, however Australia were declared the winners because, having scored 206 goals compared to New Zealand's 195, they had a better aggregate score over the series. This saw Australia win their seventh successive Constellation Cup series.

Squads

Australia

New Zealand

Match officials

Umpires

Umpire Appointments Panel

Matches

First test

Second test

Third test

Fourth test

References

2019
2019 in New Zealand netball
2019 in Australian netball
October 2019 sports events in Australia
October 2019 sports events in New Zealand